There are multiple meanings for Tahera:
 Tahera is an alternate transliteration for Táhirih,  poet
 Tahera (mining company), operates a diamond mine in Nunavut
Tahera Rahman, a newscaster